Robert Hethe (died 1396), of Little Saxham, Suffolk, was an English Member of Parliament.

Family
His son, Thomas Hethe, was an MP for Suffolk.

Career
He was a Member (MP) of the Parliament of England for Ipswich in February 1383 and January 1390.

References

Year of birth missing
1396 deaths
English MPs February 1383
People from the Borough of St Edmundsbury
English MPs January 1390
People from Suffolk